Lennart Georg Meri (29 March 1929 – 14 March 2006) was an Estonian writer, film director and statesman. He was the country's foreign minister in 1990–1992 and President of Estonia in 1992–2001.

Early life
Meri was born in Tallinn, a son of the Estonian diplomat and later Shakespeare translator Georg Meri, and Estonian Swedish mother Alice-Brigitta Engmann. With his family, Lennart left Estonia at an early age and studied abroad, in nine different schools and in four different languages. His warmest memories were from his school years in Lycée Janson de Sailly in Paris. In addition to his native Estonian, Lennart Meri fluently spoke five other languages: Finnish, French, German, English and Russian.

Lennart Meri and his family lived in Tallinn when Estonia was invaded and occupied by the Stalinist Soviet Union in June 1940. In 1941, the Meri family was deported to Siberia along with thousands of other Estonians, Latvians and Lithuanians sharing the same fate. Heads of the family were separated from their families and shut into concentration camps where only a few survived. At the age of twelve, Lennart Meri worked as a lumberman in Siberia. He also worked as a potato peeler and a rafter to support his family.

Whilst in exile, Lennart Meri grew interested in the other Finno-Ugric languages that he heard around him, the language family of which his native Estonian is also a part. His interest in the ethnic and cultural kinship amongst the scattered "Finno-Ugric family" became a lifelong theme within his work.

The Meri family survived and found their way back to Estonia where Lennart Meri graduated cum laude from the Faculty of History and Languages of the University of Tartu in 1953. On 5 March 1953, the day of Joseph Stalin's death, he proposed to his first wife Regina Meri, saying "Let us remember this happy day forever." The politics of the Soviet Union did not allow him to work as a historian, so Meri found work as a dramatist in the Vanemuine, the oldest theatre of Estonia, and later on as a producer of radio plays in the Estonian broadcasting industry. Several of his films were released and have since gained great critical acclaim.

Writer and filmmaker

After a trip to the Tian Shan Mountains in Central Asia and the old Islamic centres in the Kara Kum Desert in 1958, Lennart Meri wrote his first book, which met with a warm reception from the public. Already as a student, Lennart Meri had been able to earn his living with his writing, after his father had been arrested by the Soviet authorities for the third time. With the help of his younger brother who had been forced to leave his studies and take a job as a taxi driver, he managed to support their mother and to complete his own studies. The film The Winds of the Milky Way (Estonian: Linnutee tuuled), shot in co-operation with Finland and Hungary, was banned in the Soviet Union, but won a silver medal at the New York Film Festival. In Finnish schools, his films and texts were used as study materials. In 1986, Lennart Meri was awarded an Honorary Doctorate from Helsinki University. He became a member of the Estonian Writers' Union in 1963. In the 1970s, he was elected an Honorary Member of the Finnish Literary Society.

Tulemägede Maale, created in 1964, which is translated as To the Land of Fiery Mountains, chronicled Meri's journey to the Kamchatka Peninsula in the 1960s. Other members of his expedition group included well known scientists Harry Ling, Kaarel Orviku, Erast Parmasto, Ants Raik, Anto Raukas, Hans Trass, the artist Kaljo Polli, and filmmaker Hans Roosipuu. "Traveling is the only passion that doesn't need to feel shy in front of intellect," wrote Meri. Urban people still have an inner urge to see the world, hunger for nature. Meri did not underestimate the drawbacks of mass tourism but concluded that "science will liberate us from the chains of big cities and lead us back to nature".

Meri's travel book of his journey to the northeast passage, Virmaliste Väraval (At the Gate of the Northern Lights) (1974), won him huge success in the Soviet Union. It was translated into Finnish in 1977 in the Soviet Writers series, which also introduced to Finnish readers works by the Estonian writers Mats Traat, Lilli Promet, and Ülo Tuulik. In the book Meri combined the present with a perspective into history, and used material from such explorers as Cook, Forster, Wrangel, Dahl, Sauer, Middendorff, Cochran, and others. When he sees a mountain rising against the stormy sky of the Bering Strait, he realizes that Vitus Bering and James Cook had looked at the same mountain, but from the other side of the strait.

Meri's best known work is perhaps Hõbevalge, which translates into Silver White  and was published in 1976. It reconstructs the history of Estonia and the Baltic Sea region. As in his other works, Meri combines documentary sources and scientific research with his imagination. "If geography is prose, maps are iconography," Meri writes. Hõbevalge is based on a wide-ranging ancient seafaring sources, and carefully unveils the secret of the legendary Ultima Thule. The name was given in classical times to the most northerly land, reputedly six days' voyage from Britain. Several alternative places for its location have been suggested, among them the Shetland Islands, Iceland, and Norway. According to Meri, it is possible that Thule derives from the ancient Estonian folk poetry, which depicts the birth of the Kaali crater lake in Saaremaa. In the essay Tacituse tahtel (2000), Meri examined ancient contacts between Estonia and the Roman empire and notes that furs, amber, and especially Livonian kiln-dried, disease-free grain may have been Estonia's biggest contribution to the common culture of Europe – in lean years, it provided seed grain for Europe.

Meri founded the non-governmental Estonian Institute (Eesti Instituut) in 1988 to promote cultural contacts with the West and to send Estonian students to study abroad. He appeared in the documentary film The Singing Revolution as an interviewee discussing the collapse of the Soviet regime.

Political activity

After more than twenty years of refusals, the Soviet administration finally gave permission for Lennart Meri to travel beyond the Iron Curtain in the late 1970s, and Meri persistently used the opportunities open to him in Finland to remind the free world of the existence of Estonia. He established close relationships with politicians, journalists and Estonians who had fled from the occupation. He was the first Estonian to publicize abroad the protests against the Soviet plan of mining phosphorite in Estonia (known as the Phosphorite War), which would have rendered a portion of the country uninhabitable.

In Estonia, environmental protests soon grew into a general revolt against Soviet rule: the "Singing Revolution", which was led by Estonian intellectuals. Meri's speech Do Estonians Have Hope focused on the existential problems of the nation and had strong repercussions abroad.

In 1988, Meri became a founding member of the Estonian Popular Front, which cooperated with its counterparts in Latvia and Lithuania.

Foreign minister (1990-92)
After the first non-communist-style multi-party election in 1990, Meri was appointed to the post of Foreign Minister. As Minister of Foreign Affairs, Lennart Meri's first task was to create the Ministry of Foreign Affairs. He developed around him a group of well educated young people, many English speaking, to establish an open communication channel to the West, and at the same time to represent Estonia more widely on the international scene. He participated in the CSCE Conferences in Copenhagen, New York, Paris, Berlin and Moscow, and the foundation conference of the Council of the Baltic Sea Countries. He also had several meetings with American and European Heads of State and Foreign Ministers, and was the first Eastern European guest to give a presentation at NATO Headquarters in Brussels.

In 1992, Lennart Meri, together with 9 Baltic Ministers of Foreign Affairs and an EU commissioner, founded the Council of the Baltic Sea States (CBSS) and the EuroFaculty.

First presidential term (1992-1996)
After a brief period as Ambassador of Estonia to Finland, on 6 October 1992 he became the 2nd President of Estonia, and the first since the breakup of the Soviet Union. Meri was the candidate of the Pro Patria Union. For the only time since the restoration of independence, the election had a popular vote component. Arnold Rüütel, a former leading communist and chairman of the Supreme Council (as the Estonian Supreme Soviet had been renamed following independence), led the field with 42 per cent to Meri's 29 percent. With no candidate receiving a majority, the election was decided in the newly elected Riigikogu, which was dominated by the Pro Patria Alliance. During the campaign, some of his opponents tried to bring up questions about Meri's alleged former links with the KGB. However, these allegations did not harm Meri's reputation and public image. Lennart Meri was sworn in as the President on 6 October 1992.

Meri made public remarks against the Karaganov Doctrine on 25 February 1994 in a festival speech to the good Hamburgers, who descended from the trade barons of the Hanseatic League. Karaganov generated his doctrine in about 1992, and it states that Moscow should pose as the defender of human rights of ethnic Russians living in the 'near abroad' for the purpose of gaining political influence in these regions. Already in 1992 this idea was brought into Russian Federation politics by Boris Yeltsin.

In 1994, the Estonian Newspaper Association declared Meri the Year's Press Friend. This was the first time this award was given; since that, it has been a yearly occurrence. In 1998, Meri was given the complementary award and titled the Year's Press Friend.

Second presidential term (1996-2001)
On 20 September 1996, he was re-elected for a second and final term.

In 1999, Meri was once again given the Press Friend award.

He was a member of Club of Madrid.

Work for German refugees and for other victims of ethnic cleansing
Lennart Meri was engaged in the work for the human rights of German refugees from Central and Eastern Europe and other victims of ethnic cleansing in Europe, and was a member of the jury of the Franz Werfel Human Rights Award, which was awarded by the Centre Against Expulsions (Zentrum gegen Vertreibungen). In 1999 he received the highest distinction of the Federation of Expellees (Bund der Vertriebenen).

Personal life
Meri was married twice. His second wife Helle Meri (born in 1949) worked as an actress in the Estonian Drama Theatre until 1992. Lennart Meri's first wife Regina Meri (1932−2020) emigrated to Canada in 1987. Lennart Meri was survived by three children: sons Mart Meri (born in 1959) and Kristjan Meri (1966-2022) and daughter Tuule Meri (born in 1985), and five grandchildren.

His first cousin was the Estonian Soviet soldier Arnold Meri, who spent the last 2 years of his life on trial under charges of genocide for his involvment in deportations of Estonians, but died in 2009 before a verdict was given.

Meri was chosen the European of the Year in 1998 by French newspaper La Vie.

Death

Diagnosed with a brain tumor in mid-2005 after experiencing strong headaches, Meri underwent surgery in August. The tumor was found to be malignant and he died in the morning of 14 March 2006, fifteen days before his 77th birthday, after being hospitalized in Tallinn for months. In a televised national speech, his successor, President Rüütel, said, "In his nine years as head of state, Meri both restored the presidency and built up the Republic of Estonia in the widest sense." Finnish President Tarja Halonen stated, "The Finnish nation lost in Lennart Meri a close and sincere friend and the world, a great statesman who was one of the leading architects of the post-Cold War world." Latvian President Vaira Vīķe-Freiberga said, "the world has lost a great Estonian, a great statesman and a true European."

Meri's funeral was attended by former Swedish premier Carl Bildt, among other figures. He was buried at Forest Cemetery in the Tallinn district of Pirita.

Legacy

Lennart Meri was one of the most popularly respected presidents in Estonian history. Tallinn Airport was renamed in his name in 2009 Lennart Meri Tallinn International Airport in his honour.

Awards and decorations
Merited Writer of Estonian SSR (1979)
Correspondent member of the European Academy of Science, Art and Literature (1989)
Honorary Doctor of Helsinki University (1986)
Liberal International and Coudenhove-Kalergi award
Golden Plate Award of the American Academy of Achievement presented by Awards Council member and President of Latvia, Vaira Vīķe-Freiberga (2002)

Honours
 : Collar of the Order of the National Coat of Arms (Posthumous 2008)
 : 1st Class of the Order of the National Coat of Arms (2006)
  : Collar of the Order of the Cross of Terra Mariana (1995)
 : Grand Cross of the Order of Jordanian Revival (1993)
 : Knight of the Order of the Elephant (1994)
 : Grand Cross of the Order of the White Rose with collar (1995)
 : Knight of the Order of the Seraphim (1995)
 : Grand Cross of the Order of the Aztec Eagle (1995)
 : 1st Class of the Order of the Three Stars with collar (1996)
 : Grand Cross of the Order of Merit of the Republic of Hungary (1997)
 : Knight of the Order of the Golden Star of Liberty (1997)
 : Grand Cross of the Order of Merit of the Italian Republic (1997)
 : Grand Cross of the Order of Vytautas the Great (19 August 1997)

 : Knight Grand Cross of the Order of St. Olav (1998)
 : Grand Cross of the Order of the Falcon (1998)
 : Grand Cross of the Order of the White Eagle (Poland) (1998)
 : Grand Cross of the Order of the Saviour (1999)
 : Grand Cross Special Class of the Order of Merit of the Federal Republic of Germany (2000)
 : Grand Cross of the National Order of Merit of the Republic of Malta with collar (2001)
 : Grand Cross of the Legion of Honour (2001)

Bibliography
 1964 – "Tulemägede maale" (To the Land of Fiery Mountains)
 1974 – "Virmaliste väraval" (At the Gate of Northern Light)
 1976 – "Hõbevalge" (Silverwhite)
 1977 – "Lähenevad rannad" (Nearing Shores)
 1984 – "Hõbevalgem"

Notes

References
 Lennart Meri, portrait of a President – Baltic States City Paper
 Encyclopædia Britannica Lennart Meri
 Worldmark Encyclopedia of the Nations, Volume 6: World Leaders, 10th ed. Gale Group, 2001.

External links 

 Lennart Meri on official site of the President of Estonia
 BBC article "Estonia mourns ex-president Meri"
 

1929 births
2006 deaths
Politicians from Tallinn
Writers from Tallinn
Estonian people of Swedish descent
Estonian screenwriters
Estonian non-fiction writers
Estonian diplomats
Ambassadors of Estonia to Finland
Ministers of Foreign Affairs of Estonia
Presidents of Estonia
Translators from Russian
Translators to Estonian
University of Tartu alumni
Estonian translators
Deaths from cancer in Estonia
Deaths from brain tumor
Members of the Estonian Academy of Sciences
Lycée Janson-de-Sailly alumni
Burials at Metsakalmistu
People of the Singing Revolution
Soviet dissidents
20th-century Estonian politicians
20th-century Estonian writers
20th-century translators

Grand Crosses of the Order of Vytautas the Great
Recipients of the Order of the National Coat of Arms, 1st Class
Knights Grand Cross of the Order of the Falcon
Recipients of the Collar of the Order of the Cross of Terra Mariana
Grand Crosses Special Class of the Order of Merit of the Federal Republic of Germany
Recipients of the Four Freedoms Award
20th-century screenwriters